Scotinotylus clavatus is a species of sheet weaver found in Austria and Switzerland. It was described by Schenkel in 1927.

References

Linyphiidae
Fauna of Austria
Fauna of Switzerland
Spiders of Europe
Spiders described in 1927